Mega Twins, known as  in Japan, is a side-scrolling action game released for the arcades by Capcom in 1990. It was the tenth game released for the CP System hardware.

Plot
The game features two twins who are attempting to re-take control of their land, Alurea, after a monster unexpectedly attacks, destroying everything in its path. The people of Alurea have lived in peace for a thousand years and have forgotten how to fight, yet the land's only survivors, the twin sons of the king, must take up the challenge and return their kingdom to its former glory. The two twins, aged around 15 at the time the game takes place, venture forth in search of a legendary stone known as "Dragon Blue Eyes", which is rumoured to be able to put everything back to rights.

Gameplay
The game takes the form of a scrolling platform game, with the players controlling the characters of the twins. The game can be played alone (in which case only one of the twins is present), or with two players together controlling one twin each.

In addition to moving around, the players can jump and also cling on to vertical walls, allowing them to climb to areas that would otherwise be out of reach. Each player is armed with a magic sword, which is the main weapon used against the enemies in the game. Magic bombs can also be collected as the game progresses, each of which will cause damage to all enemies on the screen when fired. Only a limited number of these bombs can be carried by the players at a time. The blue twin does more damage with his sword, while the red twin can carry more magic spells at a time.

Each player has an energy bar which is depleted each time contact is made with an enemy or projectile. When the energy reaches zero, the player loses a life.

Chests are scattered throughout the game (some of which are hidden and must be discovered), the majority of which contain coins that add point to the players' scores, but some of them contain power ups and bonuses such as a pill that replenishes the players' energy bars and an enhanced magic sword.

Levels
The game is made up of nine levels:
Round 1 – the earth—consisting of a forest section and a lava-filled cavern. The goddess Callia is encountered at the end of this level.
Round 2 – the heavens—at the end, the Shrine of Meius, the god of the heavens, is reached.
Round 3 – under the sea—during which the twins travel through a haunted sunken pirate ship.
Round 4, stage 1 – jungle/crystal caverns.
Round 4, stage 2 – the underwater foundations.
Round 4, stage 3 – the monster castle dungeon.
Round 4, stage 4 – into the sky.
Round 4, stage 5 – ascent to the top of monster castle.
Round 5 – escape to paradise.

The player is able to select to start on any of the first three levels, but the remaining levels can only be accessed sequentially.

Reception

Julian Rignall of Computer and Video Games magazine gave the arcade game an 86% score. Mega Action praised the graphics calling it "wholly impressive" and noting the wide variety of enemies without much repetition in gameplay. They concluded with a review score of 85%.  Mega Guide gave a positive review praising the gameplay as "tough and incredibly addictive" and commented that the main characters are wonderfully animated.  The only criticism they had was the game does not have a 2 player mode.  They concluded their review stating: "The Chiki Chums are an absorbing pair and you need a bit of brain power. Should keep you log going for a while. Power Unlimited gave a review score of 60% writing: "The umpteenth platform game is called Chiki Chiki Boys. There are many similar games that are much better. So it was immediately forgotten by everyone." Steve Fountain of Nottingham Post gave the genesis version 54% commenting: "Chiki Chiki Boys is yet another colourful platform game which will only amuse young players for short periods."

Ports

U.S. Gold released ports of Mega Twins for the Atari ST and Commodore Amiga in 1991. Ports for the Commodore 64, ZX Spectrum and Amstrad CPC were advertised, but were never published, though unfinished Spectrum and Amstrad versions have since surfaced on the Internet.

A Mega Drive/Genesis port of the game was released by Sega in 1992 and 1993. Developed by Visco Corporation, this port was released in North America and Europe under the game's original Japanese title of Chiki Chiki Boys. This port lacks the 2-player cooperative mode, but is otherwise identical to the arcade version in terms of content and quality.

A version for the Capcom Power System Changer was planned and previewed but never released.

A PC-Engine Super CD-ROM² port was released in 1994 exclusively in Japan by NEC Avenue. This port features enhanced versions of most of the arcade's BGM soundtrack in CD-DA format; however, some used the PC-Engine's sound chip. Unlike the Genesis port, the PC-Engine Super CD-ROM² version includes multiplayer.

Legacy
The game is included in Capcom Classics Collection: Remixed for the PlayStation Portable, and Capcom Classics Collection Volume 2 for PlayStation 2 and Xbox, both released in 2006.

References

External links

 (as Chiki Chiki Boys)
Chiki Chiki Boys at Jap-Sai

1990 video games
Amiga games
Arcade video games
Atari ST games
Cancelled Capcom Power System Changer games
Cancelled ZX Spectrum games
CP System games
Fictional twins
Platform games
Sega Genesis games
TurboGrafx-CD games
U.S. Gold games
PlayStation Network games
Video games about siblings
Video games developed in Japan
Multiplayer and single-player video games
Visco Corporation games